Bay of Quinte is a federal electoral district in central Ontario, Canada, centred on the Bay of Quinte.

Bay of Quinte was created by the 2012 federal electoral boundaries redistribution and was legally defined in the 2013 representation order. It came into effect upon the call of the 42nd Canadian federal election, scheduled for 19 October 2015. It was created out of parts of the electoral districts of Prince Edward—Hastings (62%) and Northumberland—Quinte West (38%).

Geography
The riding contains the municipalities of Prince Edward County, Quinte West and that part of Belleville south of Highway 401.

Demographics
According to the Canada 2016 Census; 2013 representation

Ethnic groups: 89.5% White, 6.6% Aboriginal
Languages: 92.4% English, 2.9% French
Religions (2011): 68.8% Christian (20.9% Catholic, 17.7% United Church, 10.9% Anglican, 2.8% Presbyterian, 2.5% Baptist, 1.7% Pentecostal, 12.2% Other), 29.6% No religion 
Median income (2015): $31,144 
Average income (2015): $40,294

Members of Parliament

This riding has elected the following Members of Parliament:

Election results

References

Belleville, Ontario
Ontario federal electoral districts
Quinte West